Thomas A. Saunders III (born 1937) is an American investment banker and philanthropist. He is the co-founder of the private equity firm Saunders Karp & Megrue and the chairman of The Heritage Foundation.

Early life
Saunders graduated from the Virginia Military Institute in 1958, with a B.S. in electrical engineering, and from the University of Virginia's Darden School of Business with an MBA in 1967.

Career
Saunders was a Managing Director of Morgan Stanley from 1974 to August 1989. For ten years he headed the financial services corporation's equity syndications group, developing relations with corporate clients, including DuPont, Eastman Kodak, Exxon, General Motors, and USX. In the early 1980s, Saunders raised $3.8 billion in equity for AT&T in just 18 months. Following the breakup of the Bell System, he headed the advisory team that determined how AT&T would sell its regional subsidiaries. When British Telecommunications was undergoing privatization in 1983, Saunders was appointed as the company's senior U.S. adviser. He was then hired by Conrail president Stanley Crane to determine a privatization plan for the rail company. At Morgan Stanley, Saunders raised $2.2 billion to create a leveraged buyout fund, which he chaired.

Saunders co-founded the private equity firm Saunders Karp & Megrue in 1990. He was a Dollar Tree director since 1993. He has been the President and CEO of Ivor & Co., LLC, a private investment company, since 2000. Saunders also worked briefly for Allis-Chalmers Manufacturing Company. From 1995 to 2016, Saunders was an Independent Director of Hibbett Sports. He was on the Board of Directors of Teavana Holdings until it was bought out by Starbucks on December 31, 2012.

Political activity
Saunders is a major donor to the Republican Party. He donated $500,000 to the Republican National Committee and has contributed to the campaigns of John McCain, Mitt Romney, and Michele Bachmann.

In April 2009, Saunders was elected Chairman of the Board of Trustees of the conservative think tank The Heritage Foundation. During his tenure, the sister organization Heritage Action was founded and Jim DeMint was hired as President.

Philanthropy
Saunders has given the University of Virginia some $17 million over the past twenty-five years. He is chairman of the Thomas Jefferson Foundation's Board of Trustees; a bridge has been named for him. He and his wife endowed the Matthew C. Horner chair in military theory at Marine Corps University. They chaired the 1995 Dinner on the Lawn at UVA, to kick off a billion-dollar capital campaign. In 2007 the Saunders hosted the annual gala for the New-York Historical Society at the Cathedral of St. John the Divine. He and his wife were awarded the 2008 National Humanities Medal.

Personal life
Saunders married Mary Jordan Horner. They lived in New York City for many years, but now reside in Palm Beach, Florida. They have a daughter, Calvert Saunders Moore, born , a son, Thomas A. Saunders IV, and four grandchildren. Saunders has been a member of the Wall Street chapter of the Kappa Beta Phi secret society since 1979.

References

External links
 
 

1937 births
Living people
American financiers
American philanthropists
Virginia Military Institute alumni
University of Virginia Darden School of Business alumni
The Heritage Foundation
National Humanities Medal recipients
New York (state) Republicans
Florida Republicans